Olle Barkander (1 April 1918 – 9 July 2010) was a Swedish equestrian. He competed in two events at the 1960 Summer Olympics.

References

External links
 

1918 births
2010 deaths
Swedish male equestrians
Olympic equestrians of Sweden
Equestrians at the 1960 Summer Olympics
People from Hudiksvall Municipality
Sportspeople from Gävleborg County